Brunton may refer to:

Places
Brunton, Northumberland, England (near Alnwick)
Low Brunton, Northumberland, England (near Hexham)
Brunton, Wiltshire, England
Brunton Memorial Ground, Radlett, Hertfordshire, England
Brunton, Fife, Scotland; a location in the U.K.

Other uses
Brunton (surname)
Brunton, Inc., manufacturers of the Brunton compass

See also
Colmar Brunton, a market research company
Brunton compass